Ushakovo is a rural locality in Shchetinsky Selsoviet Rural Settlement, Kursky District, Kursk Oblast, Russia. Population:

Geography 
The village is located on the Vinogrobl River (a left tributary of the Tuskar in the basin of the Seym), 101 km from the Russia–Ukraine border, 4 km north-east of the district center – the town Kursk, 3 km from the selsoviet center – Shchetinka.

 Climate
Ushakovo has a warm-summer humid continental climate (Dfb in the Köppen climate classification).

Transport 
Ushakovo is located 10 km from the federal route  Crimea Highway (a part of the European route ), on the road of regional importance  (Kursk – Ponyri), on the road of intermunicipal significance  (38K-018 – Kamyshi), 1 km from the railway junction 530 km (railway line Oryol – Kursk).

The rural locality is situated 5 km from Kursk Vostochny Airport, 129 km from Belgorod International Airport and 204 km from Voronezh Peter the Great Airport.

References

Notes

Sources

Rural localities in Kursky District, Kursk Oblast